Home for Christmas is the title of a 1989 album by Debby Boone. This was Boone's only Christmas album but was reproduced on multiple occasions.  Three different editions of the album were produced; one in 1989, a CD re-release in 1992, and another CD with new cover art in 2002.  There are three different versions of the cover art for the album.

Track listing
 "Overture" [4:40]
 "Some Children See Him" (Alfred Burt, Wihla Hutson) [2:58]
 "Christmas Time Is Here" (Vince Guaraldi, Lee Mendelson) [2:43]
 "Sleigh Ride" (Leroy Anderson, Mitchell Parish) [2:58]
 "White Christmas" - with Rosemary Clooney (Irving Berlin) [3:44]
 "I'll Be Home for Christmas" (Kim Gannon, Walter Kent, Buck Ram) [2:25]
 "O Come, O Come, Emmanuel" (John M. Neale, Traditional) [3:21]
 "Silver Bells" (Ray Evans, Jay Livingston) [3:19]
 "Hark! The Herald Angels Sing" (Felix Mendelssohn, Charles Wesley) [2:45]
 "O Holy Night" (Adolphe Adam, John Sullivan Dwight) [3:01]
 "Silent Night" (Franz Xaver Gruber, Joseph Mohr) [2:49]

Production credits
Engineers
Bob Clark
Dan Garcia
Warren Peterson

Director
Regina Acuna

Arrangers
David T. Clydesdale
Ronn Huff
David Maddux
M. Maddux

Choir, Chorus
Daniel Acuna
Diana Acuna
Akil Thompson
Jake Young

Conductor
Ronn Huff

Rhythm
Michael Omartian
Dean Parks
John Patitucci
John "J.R." Robinson

Art Direction
Lee Ann Ramey

Photography
Mark Tucker

References

Debby Boone albums
1989 Christmas albums
Christmas albums by American artists
Pop Christmas albums